Hamidreza Taraghi is an Iranian bazaari merchant and conservative politician who served a member of the Parliament of Iran from 1996 to 2000 Mashhad and Kalat electoral district.

Taraghi formerly headed Islamic Coalition Party's bureau for international affairs.

References

1955 births
Living people
Deputies of Mashhad and Kalat
Members of the 5th Islamic Consultative Assembly
Islamic Coalition Party politicians
Iranian businesspeople